The coat of arms of Vestfold alludes to the tradition of the ancient Norwegian Royal house of Yngling originated in Vestfold.  It is a golden medieval cloverleaf crown on red background. It was created by Hallvard Trettebærg and approved on 30. January 1970.

References

Literature
 Hans Cappelen and Knut Johannessen: Norske kommunevåpen, Oslo 1987

Vestfold
Vestfold